Gaël Octavia (29 December 1977 in Fort-de-France (Martinique), is a French writer and playwright. She is also a film director and painter.

Biography 
Gaël Octavia grew up on a council estate in Schœlcher, where she was greatly influenced by her parents. Her mother would tell the story of Octavia's grandmother, who fell in love with a married man. When he died, she was left alone to raise her children, destitute and excluded. This family story captivated Gaël Octavia, who retold it in Ma Parole. After studying at the Lycée Victor-Schœlcher, she obtained her baccalaureate in 1995 and left Martinique to settle in Paris to study. She studied at the lycée Fénelon in Paris and then at a prestigious engineering school.

After graduating with a degree in engineering, she worked in telecommunications. In 2002, she started writing for Tangente, a popular mathematics magazine. She also became head of communications for Fondation Sciences Mathématiques de Paris.

Gaël Octavia's abilities blend the mathematical and the artistic. Her favourite means of expression are painting, film making, and above all, literary writing.

Writing 
While being influenced by Martinique, Gaël Octavia's writing deals with broad issues: the family, the status of women, social exclusion and migration.

Cultural organisations working to promote Caribbean theatre recognised Octavia's work early on. In 2005, a portrait of a power-seeking but conflicted politician, was broadcast on RFO Martinique under the title "". Gaël Octavia's plays have been staged in France, Democratic Republic of the Congo, across the West Indies and in the United States.

In 2009, her first book, was published by the New York publisher RivartiCollection.

The first of her plays to be staged, is a story told between a fisherman and the young man working for him, the third character being the fisherman's wife, who never appears. It was premiered in 2010 by the Guadeloupean director Dominik Bernard, as part of the first edition of the  Festival. After a tour of the Caribbean, in Guadeloupe, Haiti, Martinique and Guyana, the play was performed dring the 2011 Avignon Festival, before being published the following year by Lansman, under the Etc Caraibe label. , a dialogue between a soldier and his mother, was premiered in 2017 by Luc Clémentin at the Scène nationale de Martinique, Tropiques Atrium, and was performed in Martinique, Guadeloupe, Paris and Reunion.  is a story of four women narrated by Aline, a home care nurse just returned to her neighbourhood, after fleeing it seven years before. It won the prix Wepler in 2017. It has been said that in her two novels, she dismantles the myth of the poto mitan, the woman as pillar of Martinique society, saying herself of the idea: "culpabilise les femmes et dédouane les hommes", that it places a burden of responsibility on women, while exculpating men.

 was premiered in 2020 by Abdon Fortuné Koumbha at the Centre Culturel Municipal Jean Gagnant, in Limoges, as part of their autumn theatre festival. In December 2021, her work  was performed in English as Family at Molière in the Park, an outdoor theatre festival held in Prospect Park, a "dream-like" play of a closeted husband and wife, trapped by their need to keep up appearances.

Works

Novels 

 , Paris, 2017
 , Paris, 2020

Plays 

 2003 :  (unpublished)
 2004 :  (unpublished text): reading on the radio station, RFO Martinique in January 2005
 2009 : 
 2008 :  (unpublished): Special mention from the jury of the ETC_Caraïbes/Association Beaumarchais-SACD competition in 2009
 2012 : 
 2012 : , radio drama premiered on Guadeloupe Première
 2014 : 
 2014 :  (unpublished): Finaliste du Prix des Inédits d'Afrique et Outremer (Prix lycéen de littérature dramatique francophone) 2016
 2017 : Grizzly (unpublished): Finalist in the competition for the Prix Annick Lansman 2018
 2020 :

Short fiction 

 2014 : , in revue  no. 3, 2014 
 2018 : , in  no. 630, May 2018, Gallimard, 
 2020 : , in  no. 5, 2020 
 2021 : , in  no. 646, January 2021, Gallimard

Poetry 

 2013 : , in the journal  no.1, K.Editions, 2013, 
 2014 : , in the journal  no. 4, K.Editions, 2014, 

Filmography 
Short films

 2006 :  (14 min; script writer, filmmaker and editor).
 2007 :  (6 min 46 s; script writer, filmmaker and editor), with cast: Vincent Byrd-Lesage, Lydie Selebran, Mike Ibrahim, Don Pablo, Franck Salin…
 2008 :  (6 min 08 s ; script writer, filmmaker and editor), avec Isabelle Mayeko et Raphaël Lévy.
 2009 : Cocktail (8 min 40 s ; script writer and filmmaker), with cast: Vincent Byrd-Lesage, Caroline Rochefort, Céline Creux-Thomas, Véronique Sambin.

Prizes and awards 

 2009 : Special mention from the jury of the ETC_Caraïbes/Association Beaumarchais-SACD competition in 2009, for 
 2013 : Prix du meilleur texte francophone Etc Caraïbes/Association Beaumarchais-SACD, for 
 2017 : Prix Wepler, Special mention from the jury, for La fin de Mame Baby
 2017 : Finalist in the Prix Carbet de la Caraïbe, for 
 2018 : Finalist in the Prix Annick Lansman, for Grizzly
 2018 : Finalist in the Prix Jeune Mousquetaire du Premier Roman, for 
 2018 : Finalist in the Prix Régine Deforges, for

Bibliography 

  no. 162 :  1990-2006, pp. 146 to 149. Paris-France, 2006.
 , interview with Gaël Octavia, by Stéphanie Bérard, in Africultures no. 80-81, pp. 247 to 253. Paris-France, 2010. 
 , .
 , No. 42 : , pp. 121 to 131. Presses universitaires de Franche-Comté. Paris-France, 2011.

References

External links 

 Gaël Octavia's page on Goodreads
 Lansman Éditeur (French language publisher)

1977 births
Living people
French dramatists and playwrights
Martiniquais women
French novelists
21st-century French artists
Martiniquais novelists
Martiniquais artists
Martiniquais dramatists and playwrights
French filmmakers